In mathematics, an axiom of countability is a property of certain mathematical objects that asserts the existence of a countable set with certain properties. Without such an axiom, such a set might not provably exist.

Important examples
Important countability axioms for topological spaces include:
sequential space: a set is open if every sequence convergent to a point in the set is eventually in the set
first-countable space: every point has a countable neighbourhood basis (local  base)
second-countable space: the topology has a countable base
separable space: there exists a countable dense subset
Lindelöf space: every open cover has a countable subcover
σ-compact space: there exists a countable cover by compact spaces

Relationships with each other
These axioms are related to each other in the following ways:
Every first-countable space is sequential.
Every second-countable space is first countable, separable, and Lindelöf.
Every σ-compact space is Lindelöf.
Every metric space is first countable.
For metric spaces, second-countability, separability, and the Lindelöf property are all equivalent.

Related concepts
Other examples of mathematical objects obeying axioms of countability include sigma-finite measure spaces, and lattices of countable type.

References

General topology
Mathematical axioms